The Meyer May House is a Frank Lloyd Wright-designed house in the Heritage Hill Historic District of Grand Rapids, Michigan, in the United States. It was built in 1908–09, and is located at 450 Madison Avenue SE. It is considered a fine example of Wright's Prairie School era, and "Michigan's Prairie masterpiece".

History
The Meyer May House was commissioned in 1908 by Meyer S. May, president of May's clothing store in Grand Rapids, and his wife Sophie. The house's appearance stands in contrast to the Victorian houses typical of the period and the Heritage Hill neighborhood.

Meyer May House is stylistically typical of Wright's Prairie houses, a two-story, T-plan constructed of pale brick, with hip roofs and long broad eaves, art glass windows and skylights. The first floor windows are tucked under the eaves and raised from ground level, providing both privacy and providing light to the staircase and second floor gallery.

Wright carefully sited the house to allow maximum southern exposure for the living room windows and skylights and to create a spacious yard for the perennial gardens.  Leaded and colored glass accented doors and casement windows open out to terraces and gardens with garden walls and planters incorporated into the design.

Inside, wood grills hide the radiators, iridescent strips of gold art glass were placed in the horizontal grout lines of both brick fireplaces. A pastel mural of hollyhocks created by George Mann Niedecken is featured on a dividing wall between the living room and dining room. The mural had been painted over, but has since been restored. Niedecken also supervised and coordinated the home's interior, which was completed in 1910.

In 1922, two bedrooms were added upstairs, as were servants' quarters on the ground floor. May died in 1936 and the house remained empty for six years, not selling until 1942. Sold again in 1945, carports and additional entrances were added, and the bedroom additions were rented out.

The Meyer May House was placed on the Michigan State Register of Historic Sites in 1986 and is also part of the Heritage Hill Historic District. The Heritage Hill district was listed in 1971 on both the National Register of Historic Places.

Restoration

Steelcase, an international office furniture company founded and headquartered in Grand Rapids, purchased the house in 1985.

Before restoration began, extensive research into the home's original 1909 state was conducted through personal interviews, historic photos, original drawings and documents, and publications about Wright. During this restoration, the 1922 addition was removed, all the plaster ceilings were replaced, the roof was rebuilt, the Niedecken mural was restored, more than 100 windows and skylights were repaired, and an enclosed veranda was opened up. The landscaping was also restored to its original 1909 design.

Restoration began in 1986 and the house opened for visitor tours in 1987. The house is one of the most completely restored of Wright's Prairie residences.

Rooms in the restored house are furnished with a mixture of original pieces, reproductions of original pieces, and similar Arts and Crafts style items from the period. Carpets were also woven according to Wright's designs and colors.

Public tours
Meyer May House opened to the public in 1987. Tours are offered Tuesdays & Thursdays from 10 to 1 and on Sundays from 1 to 4. Admission is free.

Wright's other Grand Rapids work

The David M. Amberg House was completed in 1910. This house is not a complete Wright design, as he was preoccupied and traveling in Europe at the time. In 1909, Wright turned the project over to Marion Mahony and Herman von Holst for completion.

References

 Storrer, William Allin. The Frank Lloyd Wright Companion. University Of Chicago Press, 2006,  (S.148)

External links
Official Site
Meyer May House
Frank Lloyd Wright Foundation
Frank Lloyd Wright Preservation Trust
Photos on Arcaid

Frank Lloyd Wright buildings
Houses completed in 1909
Museums in Grand Rapids, Michigan
Historic district contributing properties in Michigan
Houses on the National Register of Historic Places in Michigan
Houses in Kent County, Michigan
Historic house museums in Michigan
National Register of Historic Places in Kent County, Michigan
Marion Mahony Griffin